El-Eulma is a city in Algeria, located 210 miles east of the capital Algiers. It is the second-largest city in Sétif Province with a population of 305,130 (1998 census). In the French colonial period the city was known as Saint Arnaud after Marshal Jacques Leroy de Saint Arnaud.

External links

 El-Eulma.com

Communes of Sétif Province
Cities in Algeria
Sétif Province